Anisomeria bistriata is a species of beetle in the family Dytiscidae, the only species in the genus Anisomeria.

References

Dytiscidae
Beetles described in 1835